Pietro Lanza di Scalea (1863–1938) was an Italian noble and politician. He served as the minister of war in 1922 and as the minister of the colonies between 1924 and 1926. He was a long-term member of the Italian Parliament.

Early life
Lanza was born in Palermo on 20 October 1863. His parents were Prince of Scalea Francesco and Rosa Mastrogiovanni Tasca from the family of the counts of Almerita. He had five siblings. Lanza received a degree in law.

Career
In 1897 Lanza was elected to the Parliament where he served for seven terms until 1924. He was the state secretary at the Ministry of Foreign Affairs between 11 February 1906 to March 1914 with some interruptions. In 1920 he founded the short-lived Agrarian Party. He was appointed minister of war to the cabinet led by Prime Minister Luigi Facta on 26 February 1922 and was in office until 1 August 1922. Lanza served as the minister of the colonies in the cabinet of Benito Mussolini from 1 July 1924 to 6 November 1926. In 1929 he was elected to the Italian Senate.

In addition to his political offices he was a member of the Sicilian Society for Homeland History, a member of the Italian Geographic Society (1909), president of the Italian Geographic Society (1926–1928) and a member of the Roman Society of Homeland History (8 July 1936).

Personal life and death
Lanza was married to Dorotea Fardella, baroness of Moxharta, and they had six children. He died in Rome on 29 May 1938.

Awards
Lanza was the recipient of the following:

 Commander of the Order of the Crown of Italy (7December 1917)
 Grand Officer of the Order of the Crown of Italy (26 November 1922)
 Grand Cordon of the Order of Saints Maurice and Lazarus (11 June 1922)
 Bailiff of the Sovereign Military Order of Malta

References

External links

19th-century Italian lawyers
20th-century Italian lawyers
1863 births
1938 deaths
Recipients of the Order of the Crown (Italy)
Recipients of the Order of Saints Maurice and Lazarus
Deputies of Legislature XX of the Kingdom of Italy
Deputies of Legislature XXI of the Kingdom of Italy
Deputies of Legislature XXII of the Kingdom of Italy
Deputies of Legislature XXIII of the Kingdom of Italy
Deputies of Legislature XXIV of the Kingdom of Italy
Deputies of Legislature XXVI of the Kingdom of Italy
Deputies of Legislature XXVII of the Kingdom of Italy
Members of the Senate of the Kingdom of Italy
Mussolini Cabinet
Politicians from Palermo
Italian political party founders
Italian Ministers of Defence
Government ministers of Italy
Nobility from Palermo